Marcelo Fabián Benítez (born 29 May 1989) is an Argentine footballer who plays as a midfielder for Gimnasia Concepción.

Club career
Benítez started his career with Argentine Primera División side Lanús in 2008, but left two years later without featuring. In 2010, Benítez joined Spanish club Real Zaragoza B. He made forty-one appearances, including twenty-nine in the 2011–12 Segunda División B season, either side of a spell back in Argentina with General Lamadrid. He left Zaragoza in June 2013 to join Deportivo Armenio of Primera B Metropolitana. His first appearance came on 18 September in a draw against Deportivo Merlo. He played eighteen times for the club. On 28 August 2014, Benítez joined Torneo Federal A club Tiro Federal.

Twelve appearances followed for Tiro Federal during the 2014 campaign. He subsequently joined fellow Torneo Federal A outfit Talleres in January 2015. Benítez played a total of three times for Talleres in 2015, which included a red card in his second match versus Juventud Unida Universitario. Talleres won the league title that season which secured promotion to Primera B Nacional. Benítez was let go to join Atlético Camioneros of Torneo Federal B soon after. They won promotion to Torneo Federal A in 2017. He stayed for two more seasons, scoring his first tier three goal on 6 October 2019 versus Sportivo Desamparados.

On 21 August 2020, Benítez signed for Torneo Regional Federal Amateur team Racing de Córdoba. However, on 9 September, Benítez joined Primera B Metropolitana's Fénix due to uncertainty of the fourth tier caused by the COVID-19 pandemic.

International career
He played five times and scored one goal for the Argentina U20 team at the 2009 South American U-20 Championship, with the goal coming in a final stage draw with Venezuela.

Career statistics
.

Honours
Talleres
 Torneo Federal A: 2015

References

External links

1989 births
Living people
Footballers from Santa Fe, Argentina
Argentine footballers
Argentina youth international footballers
Association football midfielders
Argentine expatriate footballers
Expatriate footballers in Spain
Argentine expatriate sportspeople in Spain
Argentine Primera División players
Tercera División players
Primera B Metropolitana players
Segunda División B players
Torneo Federal A players
Club Atlético Lanús footballers
Real Zaragoza B players
General Lamadrid footballers
Deportivo Armenio footballers
Tiro Federal footballers
Talleres de Córdoba footballers
Racing de Córdoba footballers
Club Atlético Fénix players
Gimnasia y Esgrima de Concepción del Uruguay footballers